is a fighting game developed by Webfoot Technologies and published by Atari It was released on November 24, 2003 for the Game Boy Advance.

Gameplay
Taiketsu includes 15 characters, including Goku and Broly. Some of those are free to play with instantly, and some can only be obtained by winning fights. The selection of the roster represents a mix of villains and heroes throughout the history of Dragon Ball Z. Each character has his own arsenal of attacks (a projectile and three special attacks), and the power to transform into a more powerful form. All special attacks require a certain part of the super meter, which fills up while standing still and holding down buttons to charge up some energy. Every fight is usually ground-based, though the players can take part in an optional Sky Battle. The one that is on the ground can either accept the challenge or wait around few seconds for the challenger to return.

The game consists of two game modes: Multiplayer and One Player, where One Player consists of events like endurance, sparring, time challenge and tournament and the Multiplayer allows linking with another Game Boy Advance user. There is also a Z-store where the earned in-game currency can be used to unlock music, images and bonus modes and setting.

Reception

Upon its release, Dragon Ball Z: Taiketsu was met with "generally unfavorable" reviews from critics, with an aggregate score of 40% on Metacritic. Hobby Consolas included it as one of the worst video games based on an anime, criticizing the characters art direction. Screen Rant observed that the game felt "unpolished", while giving signs that "no real effort or care went into its creation".

In the United States, the game sold 620,000 copies and earned $14 million by August 2006. During the period between January 2000 and August 2006, it was the 45th highest-selling game launched for the Game Boy Advance, Nintendo DS or PlayStation Portable in that country.

References

2003 video games
Atari games
Taiketsu
Fighting games
Game Boy Advance games
Game Boy Advance-only games
Multiplayer and single-player video games
Video games developed in the United States
Webfoot Technologies games